Arthur Johnson (23 January 1933 – 20 June 2011) was an English footballer who played as a goalkeeper.

Playing career
Johnson represented Southport and District Schoolboys as a youngster and went on to join Blackburn Rovers as an apprentice in 1949 before turning professional a year later.

After one appearance in the Football League over the next five years, Johnson moved to Halifax Town and enjoyed regular football before moving to Wrexham in 1960. He spent three years with the North Wales club, although the early stages of 1962–63 were spent on loan at local rivals Chester.

Johnson was released by Wrexham in 1963, going on to play non-League football for New Brighton, Rhyl and Holyhead Town. Away from football, he worked as a cost accountant.

References

1933 births
2011 deaths
Footballers from Liverpool
English footballers
Association football goalkeepers
Blackburn Rovers F.C. players
Halifax Town A.F.C. players
Wrexham A.F.C. players
Chester City F.C. players
New Brighton A.F.C. players
Rhyl F.C. players
Holyhead Town F.C. players
English Football League players
English accountants
20th-century English businesspeople